George Edward Hollest (28 November 1793 – 29 September 1850) was an English first-class cricketer who played for Cambridge University in one match in 1821, totalling 1 run with a highest score of 1.

Hollest was educated at Winchester College and Emmanuel College, Cambridge. After Cambridge he became a Church of England priest and was priest in charge of Frimley parish from 1832 until his death.

References

Bibliography
 

English cricketers
English cricketers of 1787 to 1825
Cambridge University cricketers
1793 births
1850 deaths
People educated at Winchester College
Alumni of Emmanuel College, Cambridge
19th-century English Anglican priests